, is a Japanese professional baseball catcher. He currently plays for the Chiba Lotte Marines of the NPB.

On February 27, 2019, he was selected for Japan national baseball team at the 2019 exhibition games against Mexico.

References
2. http://www.thebaseballcube.com/players/profile.asp?P=tatsuhiro-tamura

1994 births
Living people
Chiba Lotte Marines players
Japanese baseball players
Nippon Professional Baseball catchers
People from Ōsakasayama, Osaka
Baseball people from Osaka Prefecture